Events in the year 2021 in Nepal.

Incumbents
President : Bidhya Devi Bhandari 
Vice President : Nanda Kishor Pun
Prime Minister : KP Sharma Oli (till 13 July); Sher Bahadur Deuba (from 13 July)

Chief Justice : Cholendra Shumsher JB Rana
Speaker of House of Representatives : Agni Sapkota
Chairman of National Assembly : Ganesh Prasad Timilsina

Events

January
January 1 - The President calls for winter session of parliament to begin. Only the National Assembly meets as the House of Representatives was dissolved on 20 December 2020.
January 10 - The President ends the winter session of parliament. The National Assembly was in session for only 10 days.
January 16 - The first winter ascent of K2 by 10 Nepalis.

February
February 23 - The Supreme Court reinstates the dissolved House of Representatives.

March
March 7 - The Supreme Court annuls the decision of the Election Commission to grant the name Nepal Communist Party (NCP) to the party created by the merger of Communist Party of Nepal (Unified Marxist–Leninist) and Communist Party of Nepal (Maoist Centre) and positions them to their pre merger status.

April 
 April 14 - Nepali New Year, Bikram Sambat 2078 begins.
 April 24 - The replica of Bhimsen Tower is inaugurated. The original tower was destroyed in the April 2015 Nepal earthquake

May
May 9 - Prithvi Subba Gurung, Chief Minister of Gandaki Province resigns ahead of a no confidence vote scheduled for May 10.
May 10 - Prime Minister Oli fails to obtain vote of confidence in parliament. He obtains only 93 votes in favor while a faction within his own party boycotts the vote.
May 13 - KP Sharma Oli is re-appointed prime minister by the President per the provision of Article 76(3) of the constitution. Opposition parties did not claim majority leading to his appointment as the leader of the largest party in parliament.

June
June 4 and June 10 - PM KP Sharma Oli expands and reshuffles cabinet resulting with 14 members from CPN(UML) and 11 from Mahantha Thakur faction of PSP-N.
June 5 - Nepali Congress joins the government of Karnali Province.
June 9 - Nepali Congress joins the government of Province No. 2.
June 11 - Krishna Chandra Nepali Pokharel of Nepali Congress is sworn in as the second chief-minister of Gandaki.
June 22 - Supreme Court issues an interim order annulling the cabinet expansion of June 4 and June 10 by Prime Minister Oli. The order relieves 20 ministers of their positions with the cabinet now composed of only four ministers.

July
 July 12 - Supreme Court reinstates the dissolved House of Representatives and issues an order to appoint Sher Bahadur Deuba as Prime Minister per provision of Article 76(5) of the constitution.
July 13 - Sher Bahadur Deuba from NC takes oath of office as the prime minister for a fifth term.
July 27 - Prithvi Man Gurung and Amik Sherchan are appointed governor of Gandaki and Lumbini provinces, respectively.

August 
August 12 - Kul Prasad KC becomes chief minister of Lumbini Province after a power sharing agreement between Nepali Congress and CPN (Maoist Centre). 
August 17 - Hari Shankar Mishra appointed Governor of Province No. 2.
August 18 -
Ashta Laxmi Shakya becomes first women chief minister of any province in Nepal, heading the Bagmati provincial government.
Two national parties split on same day:
The largest party in parliament, CPN (UML) split to form CPN (Unified Socialist) led by former prime minister Madhav Kumar Nepal.
PSP-N split to form Loktantrik Samajbadi Party Nepal led by Mahantha Thakur. Now, there are 6 national parties in Nepal.

November 
 November 11 - 2021 Nepal census begins.
 November 14 - A massive avalanche occurred in Mount Manapathi in Mustang district.

Deaths

January 14 — Dinesh Chandra Yadav
March 26 – Nabindra Raj Joshi
May 5 – Prem Dhoj Pradhan
May 24 — Banira Giri
May 19 — Khadgajeet Baral
June 1 – Ujwal Thapa
July 21 — Uttam Nepali

References

 
2020s in Nepal
Years of the 21st century in Nepal
Nepal
Nepal